Aleksandrs  is a Latvian masculine given name. It is a cognate of the name Alexander and may refer to:
Aleksandrs Ābrams (1904-????), Latvian football forward 
Aleksandrs Beļavskis (born 1964) Latvian ice hockey player and team captain
Aleksandrs Čaks (1901–1950), Latvian poet and writer
Aleksandrs Cauņa (born 1988), Latvian football player
Aleksandrs Čekulajevs (born 1985), Latvian footballer
Aleksandrs Dibrivnijs (born 1969), Latvian footballer
Aleksandrs Fertovs (born 1987), Latvian footballer
Aleksandrs Glazovs (born 1970), Latvian football midfielder
Aleksandrs Golubovs (1959–2010), Latvian politician
Aleksandrs Isakovs (born 1973), Latvian football defender
Aleksandrs Jackēvičs (born 1958), Latvian judoka and Olympic medalist
Aleksandrs Jakushin (born 1991), Latvian ice dancer
Aleksandrs Jeļisejevs (born 1971), Latvian football striker
Aleksandrs Jerofejevs (born 1984), Latvian ice hockey defenceman
Aleksandrs Kerčs (born 1967), Latvian ice hockey left wing
Aleksandrs Kokarevs (born ????), Latvian football player and manager
Aleksandrs Koliņko (born 1975), Latvian professional football player
Aleksandrs Kublinskis (1936–2018), Latvian composer
Aleksandrs Kulakovs (born 1956), Latvian football goalkeeper 
Aleksandrs Laime (1911–1994), Latvian explorer
Aleksandrs Leimanis (1913–1990), Latvian film director
Aleksandrs Ņiživijs (born 1976), Latvian ice hockey player
Aleksandrs Obižajevs (born 1959), Latvian pole vaulter and Olympic competitor
Aleksandrs Petukhovs (born 1967), Latvian screenwriter and film director
Aleksandrs Roge (born 1898), Latvian footballer
Aleksandrs Samoilovs (born 1985), Latvian beach volleyball player and Olympic competitor
Aleksandrs Semjonovs (born 1972), Latvian ice hockey centre and Olympic competitor
Aleksandrs Solovjovs (born 1988), Latvian football player
Aleksandrs Stankus (1907–1944), Latvian footballer
Aleksandrs Starkovs (born 1955), Latvian footballer and football coach 
Aleksandrs Vanags (1919–1986), Latvian footballer and basketball player
Aleksandrs Viļumanis (born 1942), Latvian conductor

Latvian masculine given names